Nellimetla is a village in Rajavommangi Mandal, East Godavari district in the state of Andhra Pradesh in India.

Geography 

Demographics 
 India census, Nellimetla had a population of 485, out of which 243 were male and 242 were female. The population of children below 6 years of age was 14%. The literacy rate of the village was 53%.

References 

Villages in East Godavari district